Isla de sal is a 1964 Venezuelan drama comedy film directed by Clemente de la Cerda. It was his first feature film, but was considered one of his more important works. Later he won national acclaim with his blockbuster Soy un delincuente (1976).

Plot
When Aurora discovers that his father has a big debt for the purchase of a new boat for his work as a fisherman, she decides emigrate to Caracas with her godfather Simon, for achieve fame and fortune as singer after that Walter Perez, a very famous TV producer, discovers her in her town, Chichiriviche, despite the opposition of Lydia (Walter's lover) and Venancio (Aurora's boyfriend).

Cast
Lila Morillo ...  Aurora
Simón Díaz ...  Simon
Doris Wells ...  Lydia
Orangel Delfín ...  Venancio
Efraín de la Cerda ...  Walter Perez
Hugo Blanco ...  Himself
Héctor Bayardo  
Jose Vasquez  
Gisela López
Carlos Flores
Alba Pinto
Miguel Angel Fuster
Nelida Leo

Production

The film introduced Cerda's focus on poverty and marginalization, which he continued in his later works.
Due to the political content, he was unable to obtain state funding until the mid-1970s.
The director said of the film: "I knew from the start that it was a good movie, but in Venezuela there are no schools, no tradition or film industry, which is why I believe we should start with movies aimed at the general public."

Reception

The movie helped launch the career of the singer Lila Morillo.
Talking of this film and El rostro oculto (The Hidden Face) released soon after, a critic said "...these first two films reveal an interesting melange of styles and early technical ability, a search for language which came to an abrupt end in 1976 as the public demanded more and more 'delincuents'".
Another commentator said the film was still weighed down with traditional banality, but introduced situations that the viewer could identify with and that might create social concern.
By 2010, when the film was shown at the Festival del Cine Venezolano Mérida 2010 it was described a "A Venezuelan film classic".

References

External links 
 

Venezuelan comedy-drama films
1964 films
1964 comedy-drama films
Venezuelan black-and-white films
Films directed by Clemente de la Cerda
1964 directorial debut films
1960s Spanish-language films